This is a list of notable grocers. A grocer is a purveyor or bulk seller of food.

Grocers

American

  Joe Albertson
  John Buttencourt Avila
  Joseph Azzolina
  James Butler (grocer)
  Charles Butt
  Peter P. Carr
  Joe Coulombe
  Michael J. Cullen
  Joe Cury
  Bill Davila
  Demoulas Brothers
  Walter Deubener
  Reggie Dupre
  Frank Esposito (politician)
  Harvey Fitch
  Jean Fugett
  Joseph E. Grosberg
  Winfield S. Hanford
  Clinton L. Hare
  George Huntington Hartford
  George Ludlum Hartford
  John Augustine Hartford
  Steve Hodges
  George W. Jenkins
  Leo Kahn (entrepreneur)
  Edwin O. Keeler
  Bernard Kroger
  Reginald Lewis
  John Lovell (Los Angeles grocer)
  Fred G. Meyer
  Stephen P. Mugar
  Jack Muratori
  Silas Peirce
  Produce Pete
  John E. Peterson
  S.S. Pierce
  Walter Polakowski
  George Ralphs
  Clarence Saunders (grocer)
  Marion Barton Skaggs
  John C. F. Slayton
  Thomas G. Stemberg
  George W. Stockwell
  Thomas Szewczykowski
  Vivien Twidwell
  Vaccaro brothers
  Charles Von der Ahe
  Wilfred Von der Ahe
  Cas Walker
  George Butler Wason
  David Whitton (Wisconsin politician)
  Edwin Wilcox

British

  Samuel Budgett 
  Jack Cohen (businessman) 
  James Duckworth 
  David atte Hacche 
  Thomas Lipton 
  William McKillop 
  William Morrison (businessman) 
  John Benjamin Sainsbury 
  John James Sainsbury 
  Mary Ann Sainsbury 
  Lawrence Sheriff 
  John "Jack" Shield 
  Richard Yarward

Canadian

 Henry Newell Bate
 Pete Luckett
 Emilio Picariello
 Robert Edwy Ryerson
 Frank H. Sobey
 Sam Steinberg

Irish
 Packy McGarty
 Feargal Quinn

Fictional
 Chad Vader: Day Shift Manager
 Sam Drucker
 Mr. Whipple

See also

 List of online grocers
 List of supermarket chains

References

External links
 

 
Retailing-related lists
Lists of businesspeople